The list of maritime disasters is a link page for maritime disasters by century.

For a unified list by death toll, see .

Pre-18th century

Peacetime disasters

All ships are vulnerable to problems from weather conditions, faulty design or human error. Some of the disasters below occurred during periods of conflict, although their losses were unrelated to any military action. The table listings are in decreasing order of the magnitude of casualties.

Wartime disasters
Disasters with great loss of life can occur in times of armed conflict. Shown below are some of the known events with major losses.

18th century

19th century

20th century

World War I

World War II

21st century

See also

 Shipwreck
 List of shipwrecks
 List of disasters
 List of accidents and disasters by death toll
 List by death toll of ships sunk by submarines
 List of RORO vessel accidents
 List of air disasters

References

 
Lists of shipwrecks